Krishna Vrinda Vihari is a 2022 Indian Telugu-language romantic comedy film directed by Anish R. Krishna and produced by Usha Mulpuri under the banner of Ira Creations. The film stars Naga Shaurya and Shirley Setia. 

After being postponed multiple times, the film was released on 23 September 2022.

Plot
Krishna Chari (Naga Shaurya) is from a restricted and strict Brahmin family who gets a software job in Hyderabad. The moment he sees Vrinda (Shirley Setia) in his office, he falls for her. But she is quite stubborn and does not accept his love due to an issue. When Krishna further persaudes her she tells she cannot bear children due to some defect . But Krishna understands her situation and agrees. Finally wins her love but he is quite confused as to how to convince his orthodox family. After a while, he somehow manages to persuade them by playing a trick and marries Vrinda. This makes him land in big trouble. What is this trouble? How did Krishna manage it? That forms the story.

Cast 
 Naga Shaurya as Krishna Chari
 Shirley Setia as Vrinda Mishra
 Amitash Pradhan as Nandan, Manager
 Rahul Ramakrishna as Krishna's colleague
 Satya as Giri, Krishna's colleague
 Vennela Kishore as Dr. Satya
 Radhika Sarathkumar as Amruthavalli, Krishna's mother
 Brahmaji as Krishna's brother-in-law
 Jayaprakash as Krishna's father
 Annapurna as Krishna's paternal grandmother 
 Sharanya Pradeep as Syndhavi, Krishna's sister

Production 
The film was officially announced on 16 October 2020. The film was formally launched on 28 October 2020. The film was tentatively titled as NS22 and IRA4. On 22 January 2022, the film's official title was unveiled as Krishna Vrinda Vihari. Principal photography of the film began on 9 December 2020.

Music

The music composed by Mahati Swara Sagar collaborating with Naga Shourya for the fourth time after Jadoogadu, Nartanasala and Chalo. The audio rights were bagged by Saregama. The first single titled "Varshamllo Vennella" was sung by Adtiya RK and Sanjana Kalmanje and it was released on 9 April 2022.

The second single titled "Emundi Ra" was sung by "Haricharan" and it is released on 4 May 2022.

Release 
Krishna Vrinda Vihari was released on 23 September 2022. Earlier, the film was scheduled to be released in theatres on 22 April 2022. It was pushed back to 20 May and later 24 June 2022 but was not released.

Reception 
Neeshita Nyayapati of The Times of India rated the film 2 out of 5 stars and wrote "Krishna Vrinda Vihari needed better writing and direction for it to work, because it relies a little too much on the shoddily written light-hearted moments to pull it through". 
Arvind V of Pinkvilla rated the film 2 out of 5 stars and wrote "Ideally, a film like this should have strictly stayed away from action. You can have a fight if you can't resist the temptation of making your hero tear off his shirt and flash his ripped body. But there is an impossibly asinine situation when you can't have a fighting scene. 'KVV' misses this lesson, like it misses almost all script-writing lessons".

References

External links 
 

2022 films
2022 romantic comedy films
Indian romantic comedy films
2020s Telugu-language films